The Queensland Railways A12 class locomotive was a class of 4-4-0 steam locomotives operated by the Queensland Railways.

History
In 1878, the Queensland Railways took delivery of three 4-4-0 locomotives built by Baldwin Locomotive Works. Two entered service on the Southern & Western Railway and one on the Central Railway. Per Queensland Railway's classification system they were designated the A12 class, A representing they had two driving axles, and the 12 the cylinder diameter in inches.

Class list

References

Baldwin locomotives
Railway locomotives introduced in 1878
A12
3 ft 6 in gauge locomotives of Australia
4-4-0 locomotives